Sveta Petka is a village in the municipality of Bujanovac, Serbia. According to the 2002 census, the village has a population of 334 inhabitants. It has an area of 55.69 km².

Population

References

Populated places in Pčinja District